Vigdis Stokkelien (11 March 1934 – 2005) was a Norwegian journalist, and writer.  Her writing includes novels, short stories and children's literature.  She made her literary debut in 1967 with the short story collection Dragsug. Among her novels is the trilogy Lille Gibraltar (1972), Båten under storseilet (1982), and Stjerneleden (1984). She was awarded the Mads Wiel Nygaards Endowment in 1970.

References

1934 births
2005 deaths
20th-century Norwegian novelists
Norwegian women journalists
Norwegian women novelists
Norwegian women short story writers
Norwegian children's writers
Norwegian women children's writers
20th-century Norwegian women writers
20th-century Norwegian short story writers
20th-century Norwegian journalists